The Ystwyth Trail is a  multi-use rail trail linking Aberystwyth, Llanfarian, Ystrad Meurig and Tregaron in Ceredigion, Wales. Cycling and walking are permitted along the entire length while horseriding is permitted on several sections only.

The £1.7m Ystwyth Trail was partially completed in September 2008 and runs along part of the former redundant track bed of the Old Manchester and Milford Railway, a Great Western Railway branch line. It remains incomplete, as several sections of the former railway line were not purchased to create the trail due to extensive lobbying by local councillors of Ceredigion County Council against the trail, as existing landowners and farmers objected to the construction of the trail. Diversions of the trail have now been carried out onto narrow sections of existing public roads to link these missing sections, but this has created a non continuous trail with intermediate road sections on narrow roads which have considerable safety issues due to their narrowness, many bends and no traffic speed limits. Due to these objections and lobbying, it is unlikely that this trail will be developed or completed any further. 

The Ystwyth Trail links with other routes via Lampeter and Devil's Bridge creating a link with both the Lôn Cambria and Lôn Teifi long distance cycling routes (Sustrans national network routes 81 and 82).

External links
Trail leaflet
About Stage 2

References

Transport in Aberystwyth
Cycleways in Wales
Transport in Ceredigion
Rail trails in Wales
Footpaths in Ceredigion